The year 2011 is the third year in the history of BRACE, a mixed martial arts promotion based in Australia. In 2011 BRACE held 2 events.

Events list

BRACE 13

BACE 13 was an event held on November 19, 2011, at Townsville Entertainment Centre, Townsville, Australia.

Results

BRACE 12

BRACE 12 was an event held on October 15, 2011, at Derwent Entertainment Centre, Hobart, Australia.

Results

BRACE 11

BRACE 11 was an event held on September 17, 2011, at Chandler Theatre, Brisbane, Australia.

Results

BRACE 10

BRACE 10 was an event held on August 27, 2011, at Convention Centre, Canberra, Australia.

Results

BRACE 9

BACE 9 was an event held on June 4, 2011, at Townsville Entertainment Centre, Townsville, Australia.

Results

BRACE 8

BRACE 8 was an event held on April 30, 2011 at Mansfield Taver, n Brisbane, Australia.

Results

BRACE 7

BRACE 7 was an event held in January 2011, at Convention Centre, Canberra, Australia.

Results

References 

2011 in mixed martial arts
2011 in Australian sport
BRACE (mixed martial arts) events